Kontsedalov is a Russian surname. Notable people with the surname include:

 Aleksei Kontsedalov (born 1990), Russian footballer, brother of Roman
 Roman Kontsedalov (born 1986), Russian footballer

Russian-language surnames